Jewish Awareness AMerica (JAAM) is an American non-profit organization dedicated to educating Jewish students and graduates about Jewish heritage and values.  It was founded in the late 1990s by Rabbi Avraham Jacobovitz of Machon L'Torah with the aim of producing knowledgeable future Jewish leaders who will make personal, family, and communal decisions in light of Jewish teaching and tradition. JAAM  provides a range of educational programs and cultural activities designed to reconnect Jewish college students with their heritage.

Through the development of innovative, intriguing, and informative Jewish awareness programs on campuses throughout North America, JAAM attempts to bridge the gap created by the cessation of genuine Jewish education and awaken within students their sense of Jewish identity and pride.

To make a significant impact on the future of the American Jewry, JAAM targets students who have the potential of becoming leaders of the next generation. These informed and passionate Jewish students act in leadership capacities on campus and in their communities after graduation.

In 1999, JAAM established the Maimonides Leaders Fellowship Program on the University of Michigan campus in Ann Arbor, Michigan.  Owing to its popularity, the Maimonides program has been duplicated on over 25 college campuses across North America, such as the University of Maryland, Yale University, and UC-Berkeley.

Notes

External links 
 JAAM Website 
 Maimonides Leaders Fellowship Official Website 
 Meor on Campus Maimonides Page 

Jewish outreach